Demircili may refer to
Demircili, Ağaçören, a village in Akasaray Province, Turkey
Demircili, Emirdağ, a village in Ankara Province, Turkey
Demircili, Silifke, a village in Mersin Province, Turkey